SM U-84 was one of the 329 submarines serving in the Imperial German Navy (Kaiserliche Marine) in World War I.
U-84 was engaged in the naval warfare and took part in the First Battle of the Atlantic.

Initially U-81 to U-83 had one 10.5 cm gun with 140-240 rounds. U-84 - U-86 on the other hand had two 8.8 cm guns. In 1917 U-84 - U-86 were refitted with a single 10.5 cm gun (240 rounds)

Design
German Type U 81 submarines were preceded by the shorter Type UE I submarines. U-84 had a displacement of  when at the surface and  while submerged. The submarine was powered by two  engines for use while surfaced, and two  engines for use while submerged. She had two propeller shafts.

U-84 was fitted with four  torpedo tubes (two at the bow and two at the stern), twelve to sixteen torpedoes, and one  SK L/45 deck gun. She had a complement of thirty-five (thirty-one crew members and four officers).

Summary of raiding history

References

Notes

Citations

Bibliography

World War I submarines of Germany
German Type U 81 submarines
Ships built in Kiel
1916 ships
U-boats commissioned in 1916
Maritime incidents in 1918
U-boats sunk in 1918
U-boats sunk by British warships
U-boats sunk by depth charges
World War I shipwrecks in the Irish Sea
Ships lost with all hands